Dinosaurs is an American family sitcom television series that aired on ABC for four seasons from April 26, 1991, through July 20, 1994 (preempted episodes that had never been allowed to run also aired as a second part of the fourth season from September 6, 1995 through November 10, 1995), and repeats were shown on Disney Channel. The show, about a family of anthropomorphic dinosaurs,  was produced by Michael Jacobs Productions and Jim Henson Television in association with Walt Disney Television and distributed by Buena Vista International, Inc.  The characters were designed by Henson team member Kirk Thatcher.

Origins and development
News stories written at the time of the show's premiere highlighted Dinosaurs''' connection to Jim Henson, who had died the year before. Henson conceived the show in 1988, according to an article in The New York Times, adding he wanted it to be a sitcom, but about a family of dinosaurs. Until the success of The Simpsons, according to Alex Rockwell, a vice president of the Henson organization, "people thought it was a crazy idea."

In the late 1980s, Henson worked with William Stout, a fantasy artist, illustrator and designer, on a feature film starring animatronic dinosaurs with the working title of The Natural History Project; a 1993 article in The New Yorker said that Henson continued to work on a dinosaur project (presumably the Dinosaurs concept) until the "last months of his life."

The television division of The Walt Disney Company began working on the series in 1990 for CBS before the series landed on ABC, which Disney eventually acquired.

Rafael Montemayor Aguiton of Vulture wrote that upon premiere the show "was a hit", and Michael Jacobs stated that this was why the network did not interfere much in the production.

Aguiton wrote that ratings suffered from the show being moved to different time slots on the network. The animatronics made the show relatively expensive, with Stuart Pankin recalling that "I heard it was the most expensive half-hour TV show, at least at that point" and that this contributed to the cancellation.

PlotDinosaurs is initially set in 60,000,000 BC in Pangaea. The show centers on the Sinclair family: Earl Sneed Sinclair (the father), Fran Sinclair (née Phillips – the mother), their three children (son, Robbie; daughter, Charlene; and infant, Baby Sinclair) and Fran's mother, Ethyl.

Earl's job is to push over trees for the Wesayso Corporation with his friend and coworker Roy Hess, where they work under the supervision of their boss, Bradley P. Richfield.

Characters

The focus of the show's plot is the Sinclair family: Earl, Fran, Robbie, Charlene, Baby, and Ethyl. The family name is a reference to the Sinclair Oil Corporation, which has prominently featured a dinosaur as its logo and mascot for decades, under the now-rejected belief that petroleum deposits were formed during the age of the dinosaurs. Other character and family names throughout the series often referred to rival petroleum companies and/or petroleum products. For example: Phillips, Hess, B.P., Richfield, and Ethyl, among others.

Main characters

Supporting characters

Other characters
The following characters are not in the Unisaurs category below:

Unisaurs
Outside of the recurring characters, there are a group of dinosaur characters called Unisaurs. They are customizable dinosaur characters similar to the Whatnots from The Muppet Show and the Anything Muppets from Sesame Street. Some of the Unisaurs are Full-Bodied while the others are hand-muppets. They come in different types.

The following are the Full-Bodied Unisaurs:

The Hand-Puppet Unisaurs are usually used for television personalities, elders, officials, audience members, and other characters that can be viewed from the waist up. Here are the following Unisaurs in that category:

Episodes

Topical issues
Although Dinosaurs is targeted at a family audience, the show touched upon multiple topical issues, which include environmentalism, endangered species, women's rights, sexual harassment, LGBT rights, objectification of women, censorship, civil rights, body image, steroid use, allusions to masturbation (in the form of Robbie doing the solo mating dance), drug abuse, racism (in the form of a dispute between the two-legged dinosaurs and the four-legged dinosaurs), peer pressure, rights of indigenous peoples (in the form of the dinosaurs interacting with cavepeople), corporate crime, government interference in parenting, and pacifism.

In the episode "I Never Ate for My Father," in lieu of carnivorism, Robbie chooses to eat vegetables, and the other characters liken this to homosexuality, communism, drug abuse and counter culture.

The 2-part episode "Nuts to War" was a satire of American involvement in the Gulf War, with two-legged dinosaurs going to war with four-legged dinosaurs over pistachios instead of oil.

In the final season, "The Greatest Story Ever Sold" (a take-off of The Greatest Story Ever Told) references religion when the Sinclair family becomes eager to learn the meaning of their existence. The Elders dictate a new system of beliefs, and the entire cast (with the exception of Robbie) abandons science to blindly follow the newly popular "Potato-ism".

Another religious-themed episode was "The Last Temptation of Ethyl," in which Ethyl willingly allows a televangelist to exploit her near-death experience to extort money from followers. She backs out after having a second such experience, where instead of heaven, she experiences a "place not so nice": an existence surrounded by nothing but multiple Earl Sneed Sinclairs.

Several jokes in the series were at the expense of television shows in general. Earl often wants to watch TV rather than do something more practical, and several jokes accuse television of "dumbing down" the population and making it lazy.

Captain Action Figure shows up in children's programming that Fran mistakes for a commercial. Whenever Captain Action Figure mentions a product, the screen flashes "Tell Mommy I WANT THAT!". Before the appearance of Georgie, Dinosaurs used a puppet reminiscent of Barney the Dinosaur named "Blarney" in two episodes. During his appearances, members of the Sinclair family commented on his annoying characteristics and failure to teach anything to children.

The characters will sometimes break the fourth wall as well, especially Baby. An example of such is seen in the episode "Nature Calls" (Season 3, Episode 1) when Fran and Earl spell out words in front of Baby during an argument, who, after looking at the camera and saying "This could get ugly", proceeds to spell out "They think I can't spell" with his alphabet blocks.

Series finale
The final episode of Dinosaurs produced and aired on ABC, titled "Changing Nature", was intended as the series finale and depicts the irresponsible actions of the dinosaurs toward their environment, and the ensuing Ice Age which leads to their demise. In the episode, a swarm of bunch beetles do not show up as expected to devour a form of creeper vine. Charlene discovers that a wax fruit factory called FruitCo has been constructed on Wesayso-controlled swampland that serves as the bunch beetles' breeding grounds, causing the extinction of the species (save for one male named Stan) who were killed off by the developers. Charlene and Stan make this information public on the news. After getting a phone call from his superiors at Wesayso who are fearing a public relations nightmare more than any environmental threat, B.P. Richfield quickly puts Earl in charge of an attempt to destroy the vines, which have grown out of control without the beetles to keep them in check. Earl proposes spraying the planet with defoliant which causes the destruction of the vines, but also kills off all plant life on the planet. B.P. Richfield assumes that the creation of clouds will bring rain, allowing the plants to grow back, and so decides to create clouds by dropping bombs in the planet's volcanoes to cause eruptions and cloud cover. The dark clouds instead cause global cooling, in the form of a gigantic cloud cover that scientists, the viewer learns, estimate would take "tens of thousands of years" to dissipate. When he gets a call from Earl, B.P. Richfield dismisses this as a "4th quarter problem" and states that Wesayso is currently making record-breaking profits from the cold weather selling blankets, heaters, and hot cocoa mix as the result of the "cold snap". Later, Earl apologizes to his family and Stan for his actions that led to the end of the world. Baby is reassured by Robbie and Charlene that whatever happens, nobody is going to leave and that they will all stay together. Earl tries to assure everyone that it will work out okay, saying that dinosaurs have been on this Earth for 150 million years and it is not like they are going to just disappear. There is a brief shot of the wax fruit factory as it starts to get buried in snow. At DNN, Howard Handupme states that the weather forecast is the same. He concludes his broadcast by saying, "This is Howard Handupme. Good night. Goodbye." The ending credits roll with scenes of snow falling around the Sinclair home, signaling the start of a volcanic/nuclear winter. That officially ended the series on a somber note.

Stuart Pankin, the voice of Earl, stated that the ending "was a simplistic and heartfelt social comment, yet it was very powerful" with "subtlety" being a defining aspect.

The television series creators decided to make this finale as a way of ending the series as they knew the show could be canceled when they created season 4. Michael Jacobs stated that "We certainly wanted to make the episode to be educational to the audience", and as people knew dinosaurs were no longer alive, "The show would end by completing the metaphor and showing that extinction." Ted Harbert, president of ABC, expressed discomfort at the ending in a telephone call, but allowed it to go forward.

Jacobs stated that correspondence from parents revealed that "They understood the creativity in the final episode, and they were sad at the predicament we presented in the story." Pankin stated that "Everybody was at first shocked, but I think it was more of a reaction to the show ending." Pankin stated that he did not remember a significant number of audience members being angry about the ending. In 2018, Jacobs stated that the episode would have trended on social media had it been released that year.

Noel Murray of The A.V. Club stated that the episode "delivered as blunt an environmental message as any major network TV broadcast since The Lorax." Brian Galindo of BuzzFeed described it as being shocking for children.

International screening
In the United Kingdom, the show was screened on ITV in 1992 and in reruns from 1995 to 2002 on Disney Channel. In Canada, the show started airing reruns in 1992 on The Family Channel and aired them until the late 1990s; the show also aired on CHRO-TV in the early-to-mid 1990s. In Australia, the show started airing on the Seven Network from February 1992 through to 1995. In Ireland, in the mid-1990s, it was shown on a Sunday evening on RTÉ Two (known as network 2 back then). In 1994, it was shown in Italy on Rai 1. The show has also aired on TV3, then moved in 2003 to TV2 in New Zealand, KBC in Kenya and M-Net in South Africa. In Brazil the show started airing on Rede Globo in 1992, on SBT from 2003 to 2005, on Band from 2007 to 2011, and on Canal Viva in 2014.

Home media
The first three volumes were released on VHS on December 6, 1991. On May 2, 2006, Walt Disney Studios Home Entertainment released Dinosaurs: The Complete First and Second Seasons as a four-disc DVD box set. The DVD set includes "exclusive bonus features including a never-before-seen look at the making of Dinosaurs". The complete third and fourth seasons, also a four-disc DVD set, were released on May 1, 2007, with special features.
, including the episodes not aired on U.S. television. Both sets are currently available only in Region 1.

On September 29, 2017, Hulu acquired the streaming rights to Dinosaurs along with fellow Disney–ABC television properties Home Improvement and Boy Meets World, in addition to fellow TGIF programs Family Matters, Full House, Hangin' with Mr. Cooper, Perfect Strangers and Step by Step.Dinosaurs was made available for streaming on Disney+ on January 29, 2021, for the US.

Reception
As of September 2022, the series as a whole has received an approval rating of 91% on review aggregator Rotten Tomatoes. Its first season received an approval rating of 83%, its consensus reads, "Dinosaurs'', marries astonishingly expressive puppetry with genuinely funny satire of social norms, making for a forward-thinking prehistoric sitcom." While its fourth season received more critical praise, with a 100% approval rating. Common Sense Media rated the series a three out of five stars and said: "Dino puppet-driven sitcom deals with modern issues."

Awards

Footnotes

References

External links

 
 

1991 American television series debuts
1994 American television series endings
1990s American sitcoms
American Broadcasting Company original programming
American television shows featuring puppetry
Television series about children
Television series about families
Television series about dinosaurs
English-language television shows
Television series by The Jim Henson Company
Television series by Disney
TGIF (TV programming block)
Television series created by Michael Jacobs
Television series set in prehistory